Lower Merion School District, or LMSD, is a public school district located in Montgomery County, Pennsylvania. The school district includes residents of both Lower Merion Township and the Borough of Narberth.  Established in 1836, LMSD is one of the oldest districts in Pennsylvania.  It is the wealthiest school district in the state, and one of the wealthiest school districts in the country.

Schools

High schools
 Lower Merion High School
 Harriton High School

Middle schools
 Bala Cynwyd Middle School
 Cynwyd Elementary School

Elementary schools

 Belmont Hills Elementary School (originally the Ashland Avenue School)
 Black Rock Middle School
 Gladwyne Elementary School
 Merion Elementary School
 Penn Wynne Elementary School.
 Welsh Valley Middle School

Laptop webcams lawsuit 

In February 2010, a class action lawsuit was filed against the school district, alleging that Harriton High School had been secretly using remotely activated webcams built into laptops issued to their students to spy on the students in their homes, thereby infringing on their privacy rights.  The webcam picture-snapping function was part of an anti-theft mechanism to help locate laptops that were reported by students as stolen. This function was activated by the school district on numerous occasions without adherence to the established guidelines. The lawsuit was filed by the parents of a student who had been warned by Lindy Matsko, an assistant principal, that he had been engaging in "improper behavior" in his bedroom.  The schools admitted to snapping over 66,000 pictures and screenshots, including webcam shots of students in their bedrooms. However, no individuals were found guilty of spying.

See also
List of school districts in Pennsylvania

References

External links
 

1836 establishments in Pennsylvania
Lower Merion Township, Pennsylvania
School districts established in 1836
School districts in Montgomery County, Pennsylvania